Minolops casta is a species of sea snail, a marine gastropod mollusk in the family Solariellidae.

Distribution
This species occurs in the Indian Ocean off India and Sri Lanka

References

 Nevill, G. & Nevill, H. (1874), Descriptions of New Marine Mollusca from the Indian Ocean, Journal of the Asiatic Society of Bengal v. 43 21-29, 1pl.
 Rajagopal, A.S. & Mookherjee, H.P. (1978). Contributions to the molluscan fauna of India. Pt. I. Marine molluscs of the Coromandel Coast, Palk Strait and Gulf of Mannar - Gastropoda: Archaeogastropoda. Records of the Zoological Survey of India. 12 : 1-48

External links

casta
Gastropods described in 1874